The Liechtenstein Association of Athletics Federations (German Liechtensteiner Leichtathletikverband) is the governing body for the sport of athletics in Liechtenstein.

Affiliations 
World Athletics
European Athletic Association (EAA)
Liechtensteinian Olympic Committee

National records 
LLV maintains the Liechtensteinian records in athletics.

External links 
Official webpage 

Liechtenstein
Athletics
National governing bodies for athletics